The 1983 Taipei International Championships was a men's tennis tournament played on indoor carpet courts in Taipei, Taiwan that was part of the 1983 Volvo Grand Prix. It was the seventh edition of the tournament and was held from 7 November through 13 November 1983. Unseeded Nduka Odizor won the singles title.

Finals

Singles
 Nduka Odizor defeated  Scott Davis 6–4, 3–6, 6–4
 It was Odizor's only singles title of his career.

Doubles
 Kim Warwick /  Wally Masur defeated  Ken Flach /  Robert Seguso 7–6, 6–4

References

External links
 ITF tournament edition details

Taipei Summit Open